Pushtimarg, also known as Pushtimarg sampradaya or Vallabha sampradaya, is a subtradition of the Rudra Sampradaya (Vaishnavism). It was founded in the early 16th century by Vallabhacharya (1479–1531) and is focused on Krishna. A bhakti (devotional) school, Pushtimarg was expanded by the descendants of Vallabhacharya, particularly Gusainji. Its values are derived from and its universal-love-themed devotional practices center around the legendary amorous plays of youthful Krishna, such as those found in the Bhagavata Purana and those related to Govardhana Hill. Pushtimarg sampradaya recognizes Krishna by many names and epithets, such as Sri Nathji, Sri Navanitpriyaji, Sri Madanamohanji, Sri Mathureshji, Sri Gokulnathji, Sri Vittalnathji and Sri Dwarkadhishji.

The Pushtimarg subtradition subscribes to the Shuddhadvaita Vedantic teachings of Vallabhacharya, one that shares certain ideas with Advaita Vedanta, Vishishtadvaita and Dvaita Vedanta. According to this philosophy, Krishna is the supreme being, the source of everything that exists, human soul is imbued with Krishna's divine light and spiritual liberation results from Krishna's grace. The school rejects ascetic lifestyle, and cherishes householder lifestyle wherein the followers see themselves as participants and companions of Krishna and their daily life as an ongoing rasalila  of his creation. The Pushtimarg grew with the work and poetry of ashtachap – eight Bhakti Movement poets, including the blind devotee-poet Surdas.

Its followers – called Pushtimargis or Pushtimargiya Vaishnavas – are generally found in northern and western India, particularly in and around Rajasthan and Gujarat, as well as its regional diaspora around the world. The Shrinathji Temple in Nathdwara – north of Udaipur – is their main shrine, that traces its origin in 1669, when the subtradition lived in fear and felt persecuted by the Mughal Emperor Aurangzeb. This Nathdwara temple is one of the wealthiest and more elaborate shrines of Krishna in India.

Founder and History

Vallabhacharya was born into a Telugu Brahmin family in South India, to a mother whose own father was a priest in the royal court of the Vijayanagara Empire. Vallabha's family fled Varanasi after they received rumours of an imminent Islamic attack on the city, then spent the early years with baby Vallabha hiding in the forests of Chhattisgarh.

Vallabha had a conventional education in the Vedic literature and other Hindu texts. He worked in the temples of the Vijayanagara court, and then embarked on a years-long pilgrimage to the major sacred sites of Hinduism on the Indian subcontinent. He met scholars of Advaita Vedanta of Adi Shankara, Vishishtadvaita of Ramanuja, Dvaita Vedanta of Madhvacharya as well as his contemporary Chaitanya Mahaprabhu of Bengal. His visit to Vrindavan in the north persuaded him to accept and dedicate himself to the bhakti of Krishna and writing his philosophical premises in Sanskrit and a few in the Braj language. His devotional mantra "Sri Krishna Sharanam Mam" (Shri Krishna is my refuge) became the initiatory mantra of Pushtimargis. The term pushti to Vallabha implied "spiritual nourishment", a metaphor for Krishna's grace.

Vallabhacharya has been a major scholar of the Bhakti tradition of Hinduism, as a devotional movement that emphasizes love and grace of God as an end in itself. Vallabhacharya initiated his first disciple Damodardas Harsani with a mantra along with the principles of Pushtimarga.

When he died in 1531, Vallabacharya delivered the leadership of his movement to his elder son, Gopinatha. At Gopinatha's death in 1543, he was succeeded by his younger brother Vitthalanathaji, a key figure in the development of the Pushtimarg. He codified the doctrine of the movement and died in 1586. At his death, the eight primary icons of Krishna of the Pushtimarg were distributed among his seven sons, plus one adopted son. Some fragmentation followed, as each son of Vitthalanatha was able to confer initiations and start his own independent lineage, although the different branches remained unified by the doctrine. Among the descendants of Vitthalanathaji, some acquired prestige as scholars, including Gokulanatha (1552-1641), Harirayaji Mahaprabhu (1591-1711), and Purusottamalalji(1668-1725). .

In the 20th century, the Pushtimarg prospered thanks to the acquired affluence of some of its members, primarily Gujarati merchants. The Gujarati diaspora led to the foundation of important Pushtimarg centers in the United States, Canada, the United Kingdom, Australia, and New Zealand.

Belief

 Pushti Marg Because the Lord is accessible only through His own grace. The Lord cannot be attained by a given formula - He is attainable only if He wants to be attained !
 Rudra Sampradaya Because Vallabha's father was initiated in that Sampradaya as the knowledge in this line was first given to Rudra i.e. Lord Shiva.
 Shuddha-Advaita Pure Monism wherein entire universe is the manifestation of Brahman. This philosophy depends only on "Brahman" for explaining creation of the universe and it is not dependent upon concept of "Maya". Hence, it is "Shuddha". Brahman is true, the universe (being Brahman's own creation) is also true, soul (Jeev) is a part (Ansh) of the Brahman. Hence, it is "Adwait". 
 Brahmavada Brahman is the source and cause of all that is in the Universe. Purest form of monism anywhere, in any religion. Uniquely, this is the only philosophy that states, categorically, that everything, absolutely everything, is perfect just the way it is. Everything is imbibed with the spirit of the Lord and as the Lord is eternally perfect, everything is perfect!

Philosophy
It is based on the Vedant philosophy of "Ekmevadwitiyam Brahm" (the ultimate truth is one & only one Brahm) and "Sarvam Khalu Idam Brahm" (whatever is there, is Brahm).
Ved, Brahma-sutras, Bhagwad Geeta and Shrimad Bhagawat are the four fundamental scriptures.
The ultimate reality to which Ved & Brahmsutras refer as Brahm, Geeta refers as Parmatma and Shrimad Bhagawat refers as Bhagawan are all essentially one.
This philosophy is called as "Sakar Brahmvad" or "Shuddhadwait Brahmvad", which is the fundamental doctrine of Vallabhacharya.
The path to be followed to attain the ultimate blissfulness based on this principle is called as Pushtimarg.
The same Bhagawan is to be lovingly serviced in the form of Deity as Krishna who is "Sachchidanand Purushottam Parambrahm".
It (Pushtimarg) is spontaneous, selfless and motiveless love for Krishna.
It is based on pure love for Krishna.
It is expressed only through selfless service of Krishna - "Seva".
It is love after realising Krishna's true nature.
The knowledge gained is not a means of liberation.
Liberation is considered secondary to the enjoyment of Krishna's bliss.
Its aim is Krishna's happiness.
No caste, creed, color, sex or age prevents one from attaining Krishna's Grace.
It does not know any boundaries, be it time, place, or anything else.
It does not require a devotee to give up a householder's life. In fact, one can serve Him better by being a householder. This is different from other philosophies that require a life of contemplation as a monk.
All worldly desires are diverted towards Krishna; they are then not required to be suppressed.
The world is not looked down upon but is treated as Krishna's creation, and thus as real as Krishna himself.
Shri Krishna is the Supreme Deity; all the other deities reside in his form. Therefore, total faith is placed in Krishna alone.
In the state of liberation, the entity of the devotee merges into *Shri Krishna's blissful form. However, in Bhakti (especially Pushti bhakti), the devotee does not seek liberation: he enjoys Krishna's bliss by participating in it as a separate divine entity.

Practices

Brahmsambandha
The formal initiation into Pushtimarg is called Brahmasambandha. The absolute and exclusive rights to grant "Brahmsambandh" in the path of grace, in order to transform an Ordinary jiva (soul) into a Pushti "Jeev" lie only with the descendants of Vallabhacharya, known as Goswami Balaks - Vallabh kul (The word "Goswami" literally means - the one who has control over all the senses), who Vallabh Vaishnavas respectfully and lovingly refer to as: "Goswami","Bawa" or "Jai Jai". They are the actual and direct descendants of Vallabhacharya Mahaprabhu. Goswamis are responsible for the "pushti" (literally means spiritual nourishment) of all the disciples initiated by them.

Brahmsabandha is a process, where after fasting for one full day(consuming fruits and milk only) one is given the Krishna "Gadhya Mantra" in front of a Deity "Swaroop" by a Vallabhkul Goswami after which tulsi leaves (Indian Basil) are offered to the lotus feet of the Lord. The Adhikaar(right) to perform daily "seva" comes only after one is initiated into Pushtimarg by means of formally granting Brahmsambandh by a Goswami Balak. Without brahmsambandh one does not hold the right to perform seva of a Pusht Swaroop (Deity) (the swaroop which showers grace just like it did on the gopis).

Seven Swaroops Worshipped In Pushtimarg

Krishna is the chief deity of the sect. Yamunaji is worshiped as his fourth consort(Chaturth Patrani) and is the goddess who ordered Vallabhacharya to recite Shrimad Bhagwat (Shrimad Bhagwat Parayan) near her banks. It is for Yamunaji, Vallabhacharyaji composed Yamunashtakam.

Several forms/icons of Krishna are worshiped in the sect. Here are the main forms, their description and where they currently reside.
  Pradhan Peeth: Shrinathji :- Govardhannathji (seven-year-old Krishna) with the Govardhan parvat lifted in his left hand. (Nathadwara - Rajasthan - India)                                                                                                                        Navnit Priyaji :- Baby Krishna, with a butter ball (Makhan) in his right hand and a small loti a spherical vessel in his left hand which touches the ground. This swaroops Mukharvind (face) is Dark hued Megha-shyam while body is gaur Fair in color. (Nathadwara - Rajasthan - India)
 Pratham Peeth: Mathuradheeshji :- Lord of Madhuryata - The lord of Sweetness in Nature. Mathuradheeshji has a four armed image.This swaroop has a round Pithika Stele. (Kota - Rajasthan - India)                                                                                                                                 Natavarlalji & Shyamlalji :- Dancing Krishna. It is the swaroop of Lord Krishna doing the Kaliya-Mardan. Natvarlalji shares his Haveli with Shyamlalji. Natvarlalji is the Nidhi-swarup Of Mathuradheeshji.               (Ahmedabad -Gujarat)
 Dwitiya Peeth: Vitthalnathji :- Lord, waiting with His hands on waist, after "Cheer Haran Lila".  (Nathdwara - Rajasthan - India)
 Trutiya Peeth: Dwarikadheeshji :- Lord of Dwarika - four armed image of the Lord. This swaroop has a square Pithika Stele. It is different from Dwarkadhish in Dwarka, Gujarat. (Kankroli- Rajasthan)
 Chaturth Peeth: Gokul Nathji :- Lord of Gokul - four armed image of the Lord, lifting the mountain and playing his flute. He is accompanied by two Swaminiji -Shri Radha and Chandrawali on either side of him. (Gokul - UP - India)
 Pancham Peeth: Gokul Chandramaji :- The "moon" of Gokul - dark image of the Lord playing a flute. He has a Tribhangi posture i.e. bent from three sides - the neck, waist and legs. This swaroop is of the Maharaas utsav during Sharad purnima. (Kamvan -Rajasthan)
 Sashtha Peeth: Bala Krishnalalji :- Baby Krishna, with a butter ball in his right hand. This swaroop is quite similar to Navneetpriyaji, but is particularly different. (Surat-Gujarat)                                                                                                                                                                                                                                   Kalyanraiji :- Krishna with 4 arms and having triangle pitika stele. Kalyanraiji is the Nidhi-swarup Of Balkrishnalalji.    (Vadodara-Gujarat)                                Mukundraiji :- Baby Krishna crawling with butter. Mukendraiji is also the Nidhi-swarup Of Balkrishnalalji. (Vadodara-Gujarat), (Varanasi-UP)
 Saptam Peeth: Madan Mohanlalji :- This swaroop is also accompanied by two Swaminiji - Radha and Chandrawali. (Kamvan - Rajasthan)

Pushtimarg Seva Prakar (devotional worship in Pushtimarg)
Seva is a key element of worship in Pushti Marg. All followers are expected to do seva to their personal icon of Krishna.
In Pushti Marg, where the descendants of shrimad Vallabhcharyaji reside and perform Seva of their own idol of Shri krishna is called a "haveli" - literally a "mansion". Here the seva of thakurji(Shri Krishna) is performed with the bhaav of the Nandalaya. There is a daily routine of allowing the laity to have "darshan" (adore) the divine icon 8 times a day. The Vallabhkul adorn the icon in keeping with Pushti traditions and follow a colourful calendar of festivals.

Some of the important aspects of Pushtimarg Seva are:
 Raag (playing and hearing traditional Haveli music)
 Bhog (offering pure vegetarian saatvik food that does not contain any meat or such vegetables as onion, garlic, cabbage, carrots, and a few others)
 Vastra and Shringar (decorating the deity with beautiful clothes and adorning the deity with jewellery)

All of the above three are included in the daily seva (devotional service) which all followers of Pushtimarg offer to their Thakurji (personal Krishna deity), and all of them have been traditionally prescribed by Goswami Shri Vitthalnathji almost five hundred years ago. Shri Vitthalnathji is also called Gusainji (Vallabhacharya's second son). The raag, bhog, and vastra and shringar offerings vary daily according to the season, the date, and time of day, and this is the main reason why this path is so colourful and alive.

Seva is the most important way to attain Pushti in Pushtimarg and has been prescribed by Vallabhacharya as the fundamental tenet. All principles and tenets of Shuddhadvaita Vaishnavism stem out from here.

Pilgrimage

Baithak or Bethak, literally "seat", is the site considered sacred by the followers of the Pushtimarg for performing devotional rituals. These sites are spread across India and are chiefly concentrated in Braj region in Uttar Pradesh and in western state of Gujarat. Total 142 Baithaks are considered sacred; 84 of Vallabhacharya, 28 of his son Viththalanath Gusainji and 30 of his seven grandsons. They mark public events in their lives. Some of them are restricted or foreboding.

Festivals

Pushti Marg followers celebrate several festivals. Icons are dressed and bejeweled to suit the season and the mood of the festival. All festivals are accompanied by a vegetarian feast which is offered to the deity and later distributed to the laity. Most festivals mark the important events in the life of Krishna, the birth of one of Vishnu's major avatars (Ram Navami, Nrushi Jayanti, Janmashtami (Krishna), Vaman Dwadashi), the festivals marking the change of seasons, the day of installation of an icon at the temple and the birthdays of sect's leaders and their descendants.

Music
Haveli Sangeet or Kirtans are devotional hymns written by the asht sakhas for and about Shrinathji. The instruments played during Kirtan include zanz, manjira, dholak, pakhavaj/mrudang, daff, tampura, veena, harmonium, tabla, etc.

Doctrine

The works of Vallabhacharya are central to Pushtimarg. He wrote commentaries on Sanskrit scriptures, the Brahma-Sutras (Anubhasya), and Shreemad Bhagwatam (Shree Subodhini ji, Tattvarth Dip Nibandh).

Shodash Granthas
Also, in order to help devotees on this path of devotion, he wrote 16 pieces in verse which we know as the Shodasha Granthas. These came about as answers to devotees. The verses define the practical theology of Pushtimarga.

The Shodash Granthas(doctrines) serve as a lighthouse for devotees. They speak about increasing love for Shri Krishna through Seva (service) and Smarana (remembering). These doctrines are Mahaprabhu's way of encouraging and inspiring devotees on this path of grace. The central message of the Shodasha Granthas is, total surrender to the Lord. A Goswami can initiate an eager soul to this path of Shri Krishna's loving devotion and service. The verses explain the types of devotees, the way to surrender and the reward for Seva, as well as other practical instructions. The devotee is nurtured by the Lord's grace.

 Shree Yamunastakam: An ode to Shree Yamuna Maharani
 Baala Bodhah: A guide for beginners on the path of devotion
 Siddhant-Muktavali: A string of pearls consisting of the principles/fundamentals of Pushtimarg
 Pusti-Pravaha-Maryadabhedah: The different characteristics of the different types of souls (Receptivity of the Lord’s grace)
 Siddhant-Rahasya: The Secret behind the Principles
 Navratna : Nine jewels of instructions (Priceless instructions for a devotee)
 Antah-Karan-Prabodhah: Consoling one's Heart (Request to one’s own heart)
 Vivek-Dhairy-Aashray: Of discretion, patience and surrender
 Shree Krushna Aashray: Taking Shree Krushna’s shelter
 Chatuhshloki: A Four Verses (Verser) illustrating the four principles of life; Dharma, Arth, Kaam, Moksh 
 Bhakti-Vardhini: Increase of devotion
 Jal-Bhed: 21 types of Orators (Vakta).
Pancha-Padyaani: 3 types of Listeners (Shrota) 
Sannyasa-Nirnayah: Decision on taking Renunciation
Nirodh-Lakshanam: Identifying characteristics of detachment
Seva-Phalam: The reward of performing seva (worship) of the Lord
Apart from Shodash Granths  Shri Vallabhacharya wrote following Granths " Books : 
 Anubhashya on 5 Brhamasutra(Incomplete)
 Bhashya on 6 Jaimini Sutra (Incomplete)
 Bhashya on Gayatri
 Purvamimamsa-Bhashya-Karika
 'Subodhini' a commentary on Bhagavat Purana (Incomplete)
 'Sukshmatika' a commentary on Bhagavat Purana (Incomplete)
 Bhagavat Dashama-skandha Anukramanika
 Patravalambanam
 Shiksha-shlokah
 TATVARTHADIPNIBANDHA 1.Shastrartha-prakaranam 2.Sarvanirnaya-prakaranam 3.Bhagavatartha-prakaranam
 STOTRA: -Madhurashtakam -Parivrdhashtakam, -Shri Krishnashtakam, -SriGirirajadharyashtam, -Premamrtam -Shri Gopijanavallabhashtakam etc. -Shri Purushottama-nama-sahasrm (One thousand names of Shri Krishna from Bhagavat Purana) -Trividhalila-namavali

References

Further reading
 E. Allen Richardson. Seeing Krishna in America: The Hindu Bhakti Tradition of Vallabhacharya in India and Its Movement to the West. Jefferson: McFarland, 2014. 240 pp. .
 The Path of Grace: Social Organization and Temple Worship in a Vaishnava Sect. By Peter Bennett. Delhi: Hindustan Publishing Corporation, 1993. xi, 230 pp.

External links

 shodash-granths-by-vallabhaacharya shodash-granths-by-vallabhaacharya (1550)
 Pustimarg Sahitya by Mota Mandir Mumbai
 Official website of the main seat of Pushtimarg at Nathdwara
 Shrinathji Nathdwara
 Encyclopedia on Pushtimarg
Bhakti-era Hindu sects
Krishnaite Vaishnava denominations
Religions that require vegetarianism
Anti-caste movements
1500s establishments in India